The English psychedelic rock band Kula Shaker, formed in 1995, has released six major studio albums, as well as numerous singles with extensive B-sides, music videos, and EPs. The band has also contributed to film soundtracks and TV advertisements.

Albums

Studio albums

Compilation albums

Extended plays

Singles

Music videos

References

Discographies of British artists
Rock music group discographies